Tony Burgess may refer to:

 Tony Burgess (author) (born 1959), Canadian author
 Tony Burgess (footballer) (born 1961), Australian rules footballer

See also
 Anthony Burgess (1917–1993), English writer and composer